The folP RNA motif is a conserved RNA structure that was discovered by bioinformatics.
folP motifs are found in the genus Dialister.

folP motif RNAs likely function as cis-regulatory elements, in view of their positions upstream of protein-coding genes.  The RNAs are, in most cases, followed by Rho-independent transcription terminators, which might participate in the cis regulation performed by folP RNAs.
The RNAs are upstream of genes encoding dihydropteroate synthase, which is involved in folate metabolism.

References

Non-coding RNA